Lucius Valerius Flaccus may refer to:

 Lucius Valerius Flaccus (consul 261 BC)
 Lucius Valerius Flaccus (consul 195 BC)
 Lucius Valerius Flaccus (consul 131 BC), Flamen Martialis
 Lucius Valerius Flaccus (consul 100 BC)
 Lucius Valerius Flaccus (consul 86 BC)
 Lucius Valerius Flaccus (praetor 63 BC), son of Lucius Valerius Flaccus (consul 86 BC)

See also

 Valerius Flaccus (disambiguation)